Abd-Al-Ali Morakinyo Olaposi Koiki (born 22 August 1999) is an English professional footballer who plays as a left back for Northampton Town.

Career
Born in Kensington, London, Koiki began his career in the youth team of Crystal Palace before being released at the age of eleven. He later moved to Burnley in the summer of 2016 following a trial, after he had been spotted playing local football for Kinetic Academy in Croydon. He signed his first professional contract at the end of the 2017–18 campaign having moved up to the development squad at the start of the season. He moved on loan to League Two side Swindon Town in January 2019 until the end of the season. He made his professional debut on 12 January 2019 replacing Matthew Taylor as a substitute in the 2–2 draw with Lincoln City.

He was offered a new contract by Burnley at the end of the 2019–20 season, but rejected the offer and left the club.

Bristol Rovers
On 22 October 2020 he joined League One side Bristol Rovers. Koiki made his debut for the club on 3 November 2020, coming off of the bench in the 65' minute of a 2-0 defeat to Peterborough United and made his full debut that weekend in an FA Cup victory over Walsall. Koiki scored his first professional goal with the opener in a 2–1 EFL Trophy victory over Leyton Orient on 8 December 2020. At the end of the season it was announced that Koiki would not be having his contract renewed and would leave the club after just a year.

Northampton Town
On 23 July 2021, Koiki joined recently relegated League Two side Northampton Town on a one-year contract after impressing on trial.

Personal life
Koiki is of Nigerian descent.

Career statistics

References

1999 births
Living people
English footballers
English people of Nigerian descent
Crystal Palace F.C. players
Burnley F.C. players
Swindon Town F.C. players
Bristol Rovers F.C. players
Northampton Town F.C. players
English Football League players
Association football fullbacks
Black British sportspeople